Olivier Deman (born 6 April 2000) is a Belgian footballer who plays as a winger for Cercle Brugge.

References

External links

Living people
2000 births
Association football midfielders
Belgian footballers
Cercle Brugge K.S.V. players
Belgian Pro League players